Lance Corporal James Thomas Duane Ashworth, VC  (26 May 1989 – 13 June 2012) was a British soldier and posthumous recipient of the Victoria Cross (VC), the highest award for gallantry in the face of the enemy that can be awarded to British and Commonwealth forces. He was killed in Afghanistan on 13 June 2012 as he led his fire team in an attack on an enemy-held compound. The award was gazetted on 22 March 2013, having been confirmed by the British Army earlier in the week. Ashworth is the 14th recipient of the award since the end of the Second World War.

Early life
Ashworth lived and grew up in Corby, Northamptonshire, where he attended Lodge Park Technology College. A keen sportsman, he represented his school at both football and basketball.

In 2006, aged 17, Ashworth joined the British Army following his father who had previously served in the Grenadier Guards. Ashworth trained at the Infantry Training Centre in Catterick before being posted to Nijmegen Company, Grenadier Guards, which is focused on public duties and state ceremonial events in London.

He was identified as being capable of becoming a paratrooper and was assigned to the Guards' Parachute Platoon, which is part of 3rd Battalion, Parachute Regiment. In his three years in the platoon, he took part in Operation Herrick 8 and was deployed to exercises overseas on three occasions. He was deployed to Canada before joining the Reconnaissance Platoon for Operation Herrick 16.

Death

On 13 June 2012, Ashworth was serving as part of the Reconnaissance Platoon, 1st Battalion Grenadier Guards. He was on a patrol in the Nahri Saraj District of Helmand Province, Afghanistan. He was leading a fire-team, clearing out compounds, when his team came under fire from Taliban armed with rifles and rocket-propelled grenades from several mud huts. Ashworth charged the huts, providing cover for his team who followed in single file behind him. After his fire-team took out most of the insurgents, Ashworth pursued the final remaining member. He crawled forward under cover of a low wall while his team provided covering fire and acted as a diversion. When he got within  of the enemy, he was killed as he attempted to throw a grenade. Captain Michael Dobbin, commander of the platoon, who was awarded the Military Cross for repeated courage throughout the operational tour, said about Ashworth, "His professionalism under pressure and ability to remain calm in what was a chaotic situation is testament to his character. L/Cpl Ashworth was a pleasure to command and I will sorely miss his calming influence on the battlefield. Softly spoken, he stepped up to every task thrown in his direction." After his death, his body was taken to Camp Bastion and was then repatriated to the United Kingdom.

On 16 March 2013, British media reported that Ashworth was to be posthumously awarded the Victoria Cross for bravery and this was confirmed by the Ministry of Defence on 18 March 2013. His citation was read out at the Grenadier Guards’ barracks in Aldershot. He was only the second person to be awarded the medal during the Taliban insurgency, after Bryan Budd for his actions in 2006. Ashworth is the 14th person to be awarded the Victoria Cross since the end of the Second World War. The Victoria Cross was first awarded for actions in the Crimean War of 1854–56, and is the highest British military award.

Victoria Cross citation
The announcement and accompanying citation for the decoration was published in supplement to the London Gazette on 22 March 2013, reading

Personal life
Ashworth played football both for his regiment and for a local team near his home. He has two sisters and two brothers, one of whom is also a soldier.

References

1989 births
2012 deaths
Burials in Northamptonshire
British Army recipients of the Victoria Cross
British military personnel killed in the War in Afghanistan (2001–2021)
Grenadier Guards soldiers
People from Kettering
People from Corby
War in Afghanistan (2001–2021) recipients of the Victoria Cross
Military personnel from Northamptonshire